Josh Clark (born June 14, 1979) is an American politician who served as a member of the Georgia House of Representatives for the 98th district from 2011 to 2015.

Career

Georgia House of Representatives 
Clark was first elected to the Georgia House of Representatives in 2011 and left office in 2015. In 2012, Clark received the Defender of Liberty Award from the American Conservative Union.

2022 U.S. Senate campaign 
Clark was a Republican primary candidate for the 2022 United States Senate election in Georgia. Clark lost the primary, coming fourth. Herschel Walker received the nomination.

References 

Living people
Businesspeople from Georgia (U.S. state)
Members of the Georgia House of Representatives
1979 births
Candidates in the 2022 United States Senate elections